Tobias Mehler (born April 1, 1976) is a Canadian actor who has appeared in film and television productions.

Career 
Mehler is known for playing d'Artagnan on Young Blades, Zak Adama on Battlestar Galactica and Lieutenant Graham Simmons in Stargate SG-1. He appears opposite Charlize Theron in Battle in Seattle, was a regular on the Canadian series Robson Arms for two seasons, and played a lead in the Fox pilot Killer App written by Garry Trudeau and directed by Robert Altman. Mehler has also appeared in several Christmas-themed television films.

Mehler played Harvey in Sabrina the Teenage Witch in 1996, Andy Effkin In Disturbing Behavior in 1998 and Tommy Ross in Carrie.

Filmography

Film

Television

References 

1976 births
Canadian male film actors
Canadian male stage actors
Canadian male television actors
Living people
People from Yellowknife
20th-century Canadian male actors
21st-century Canadian male actors
Male actors from the Northwest Territories

External links